Hopper, Inc. is a travel booking app and online travel marketplace that sells flights, hotels, rental cars, and short-term rentals. The company is headquartered in Montreal, Canada and Boston, Massachusetts.

History
Hopper was founded in April 2007 by Frederic Lalonde and Joost Ouwerkerk, both of whom were executives at Expedia Group. It started as a travel planning tool with which a user could search for different places and activities.

In 2012, Dakota Smith joined as a third co-founder and Hopper received $12 million in Series B funding from investment funds such as OMERS and Atlas Venture.

In January 2014, Hopper was launched after developing its platform for over six years as a startup and new technology incubator. Specifically, during the initial development phase between 2007 and 2014, Hopper developed technology that crawled over two billion web pages for travel-related information and added it to Hopper database.

In April 2014, Seth Kugel published an article that covered Hopper's online research reports that gave details on how travelers could optimize their travel costs. Hopper shifted its business model in May 2014, becoming a big data-driven website that helped travelers choose where to fly and when to buy their tickets.

In January 2015, Hopper launched its app with functions such as flight price prediction and real-time price monitoring.

In March 2016, Hopper received $62 million in funding to further develop its airfare prediction algorithm.

In 2017, the company expanded its platform by adding a hotel booking service.

In October 2018, Hopper received an investment of $100 million in funding to expand its services internationally.

In 2019, Hopper started a sustainability program, named Hopper Trees, in partnership with Eden Reforestation Projects, to plant trees for every airfare purchase and two for every hotel room booking in order to offset carbon dioxide (CO₂) emissions.

In late 2019, Hopper expanded its services and added fintech-based functions designed to help users optimize their travel costs.

In March 2021, Hopper became a unicorn after receiving an investment of $170 million from Capital One.

In August 2021, Hopper raised an additional $175 million in a series G funding round led by GPI Capital.

In January 2022, Hopper launched Hopper Homes to provide short-term home rentals.

In February 2022, Hopper was valued at $5 billion after a $35 million secondary share sale.

In November 2022, Hopper received $96 million in investment from Capital One.

Acquisition history
In late 2019, Hopper acquired a Colombian travel company, named GDX Travel.

In October 2021, the company acquired PlacePass, a Boston-based online booking service. In the same year, Hopper also acquired a trip-planning service, Journy.

In February 2022, Hopper acquired a Paris-based merchandising services provider, Smooss for an undisclosed amount.

Technology and applications
Hopper uses machine learning algorithms extensively to dynamically change the price of its fintech offers, which are designed to provide some flexibility for users. Initially, its price-forecasting algorithm that uses historical data to predict flight's price, was designed in 2010 in Cambridge, Massachusetts.

Hopper applies its technology to give its users some additional fintech functions based on historical data, including "price freezing to protect against pricing volatility", "cancelling or changing flight bookings at short notice", switching hotel after check-in and replacing it with another hotel, or if a flight is delayed for any reason, changing it without overcharging.

Hopper Cloud
In 2021, Hopper launched its business-to-business initiative called Hopper Cloud, where enterprises can use its white-label travel portals or distribute Hopper's travel and fintech products.

Hopper's customers include Capital One, where Hopper develops its travel booking portal, Capital One Travel.

See also
 Online marketplace
 Expedia
 Airbnb

References

External links
 Official website

2007 establishments in Canada
Companies established in 2007
Companies based in Montreal
Travel and holiday companies of Canada